The Latin Grammy Award for Best Long Form Music Video is an honor presented annually at the Latin Grammy Awards, a ceremony that recognizes excellence and promotes a wider awareness of cultural diversity and contributions of Latin recording artists in the United States and internationally. According to the category description guide for the 13th Latin Grammy Awards, the award is for video albums consisting of more than one song or track and is awarded to artists, video directors and/or producers of at least 51% of the total playing time. If the work is a tribute or collection of live performances, the award is presented only to the directors or producers.

The accolade for Best Long Form Music Video was first presented at the 7th Latin Grammy Awards in 2006 as a tie between Spanish recording artists Bebo and Cigala for their album Blanco y Negro En Vivo (2005) and Café Tacuba for their live album Un Viaje (2005). Three recipients of the award won with a MTV Unplugged release; Ricky Martin (2006), Julieta Venegas (2007) and Juanes (2012). Café Tacuba is the only act to win the award more than once (2006 and 2014). Mexico and Venezuela are the only countries with more than one award winner.

Winners and nominees

2000s

2010s

2020s

Notes 
 Each year is linked to the article about the Latin Grammy Awards held that year.
 Showing the name of the performer and the nominated album

References 
General

Specific

External links 

Official website of the Latin Grammy Awards

 
Awards established in 2006
Long Form Music Video